Sky Touch School is an English-medium high school located in the town of Bijbehara, Jammu and Kashmir, India.

References

High schools and secondary schools in Jammu and Kashmir
Anantnag district
2000 establishments in Jammu and Kashmir
Educational institutions established in 2000